Acahela is an historic community located in Monroe County,  Pennsylvania, United States. It had a summer post office that operated from  1930 until 1944.

Camp Acahela is a 242-acre year-round camp operated by the Boy Scouts of America near the confluence of the Lehigh River and Tobyhanna Creek in Tobyhanna Township, Monroe County.

Sources
 Journal of the American Philatelist, published monthly. State College, Pennsylvania. 072000/p647

References

Populated places in Monroe County, Pennsylvania